The Zlata (in its upper course: Dobrun) is a right tributary of the Râul Mare in Romania. Its source is in the Retezat Mountains.

References

Rivers of Romania
Rivers of Hunedoara County